Pionacercus is a genus of mites belonging to the family Pionidae.

?The species of this genus are found in Europe.

Species:
 Pionacercus leuckarti (Piersig, 1894) 
 Pionacercus norvegicus Thor, 1898

References

Trombidiformes
Trombidiformes genera